"Von guten Mächten" (By good forces) is a Christian poem which Dietrich Bonhoeffer wrote in 1944 when he was imprisoned in the basement prison of the Reich Security Main Office because of his resistance to the Nazis. It is his last theological text before he was executed on 9 April 1945. It became a frequently sung hymn, with different melodies, which has appeared in current German hymnals. The incipit is: "Von guten Mächten treu und still umgeben", which can be translated word by word as: "By good forces devotedly and quietly surrounded", or, in a more poetic, singable, widely used version: "By loving forces silently surrounded, ...". The seventh and last stanza "Von guten Mächten wunderbar geborgen" respectively "By loving forces wonderfully sheltered" is used as a refrain in this popular rendition.

History 
Bonhoeffer was arrested as a prominent opponent of the Nazi regime on 5 April 1943, and was kept at different prisons. His writings in prison showed a new dimension in his theology. From mid-1944, around the time of the 20 July plot, he began to also write poems.

He was transferred to the Reich Security Main Office in Berlin on 8 October 1944. From there he wrote on 19 December 1944 to his betrothed Maria von Wedemeyer, adding the poem with the comments "ein paar Verse, die mir in den letzten Abenden einfielen" (a few verses that occurred to me the last evenings) and "als ein Weihnachtsgruß für Dich und die Eltern und Geschwister" (as a Christmas greeting for you and the parents and siblings). The poem refers both to his own situation and that of his family: he had to face possible execution, his brother Klaus and his brothers-in-law Hans von Dohnanyi and Rüdiger Schleicher were in prison, his brother Walter had died as a soldier, and his twin sister  had left the country with her Jewish husband .

Bonhoeffer's letters to Maria were not intended to be published. She made a copy for relatives for Christmas 1944. A derived typed copy appeared first in Geneva in 1945 in the ecumenical Gedenkschrift (memorial writing) Dietrich Bonhoeffer: Das Zeugnis eines Boten. This version was believed to be authentic when  included it in his collection of Bonhoeffer's letters, Widerstand und Ergebung ('Resistance and Resignation'), in 1951. It differs from the original in four instances and served as the basis for hymn versions. When the original letter was published in 1988, it was printed then in the critical edition, Dietrich Bonhoeffer Werke, vol. 8 (1998). The Protestant hymnal Evangelisches Gesangbuch of 1993 used the original text, followed by other hymnals and song books.

Form and text 
The poem is in seven even stanzas, different from Bonhoeffer's other poetic texts from the period, such as "Glück und Unglück", "Wer bin ich?", "Der Freund", "Vergangenheit". The seven stanzas are numbered as in a hymnal, possibly to clarify their order.

The text of the Evangelisches Gesangbuch follows Bonhoeffer's original:

Melodies 
The meter of the poem does not match any hymn tune of the time. The personal beginning is not well suited to singing as a congregation. The earliest setting to music by Otto Abel in 1959 used originally only the final stanza.

The most popular melody was written by Siegfried Fietz in 1970. In the style of Neues Geistliches Lied, he used the last stanza as a refrain, with a different melody in lower range for the verses. It appears in several regional parts of the Evangelischen Gesangbuch, and in regional parts of the Catholic hymnal Gotteslob, while the main section has the melody by Kurt Grahl as GL 430.

Literature 
 Jürgen Henkys: Von guten Mächten treu und still umgeben. In: Hansjakob Becker u. a.: Geistliches Wunderhorn. C. H. Beck, München 2001, pp 452–461.

References

External links 

 Siegfried Fietz singt "Von guten Mächten wunderbar geborgen" (YouTube)

Dietrich Bonhoeffer
German poems
20th-century hymns in German
1944 in Christianity
Contemporary Christian songs
1959 songs 

Neues Geistliches Lied